Don't Knock the Baldhead! Live is a live album by British 2 Tone and ska band Bad Manners, released on 5 November 1997. The album was re-released on 8 February 2005 as Feel Like Jumping! Greatest Hits Live! The album was recorded in summer 1996 when the band performed live at two Scandinavian festivals and was engineered by their producer Roger Lomas.

Track listing
 "Echo 4 + 2"
 "This Is Ska"
 "My Girl Lollipop"
 "Fatty Fatty"
 "Lorraine"
 "Feel Like Jumping"
 "Skaville UK"
 "Walking in the Sunshine"
 "King Ska/Fa"
 "Samson and Delilah"
 "Wet Dream"
 "Just a Feeling"
 "El Pussy Cat"
 "Ne-Ne Na-Na Na-Na Nu-Nu"
 "Sally Brown"
 "Don't Be Angry"
 "Wooly Bully"
 "Inner London Violence"
 "Special Brew"
 "Don't Knock the Bald Head!"
 "Lip Up Fatty"
 "Can Can"

Bad Manners albums
1997 live albums
Sanctuary Records live albums